Poshtqaleh (also Romanized as Poshtqalʿeh) is a village in Howmeh Rural District, in the Central District of Bam County, Kerman Province, Iran. At the 2006 census, its population was 413, in 113 families.

References 

Populated places in Bam County